"That's the Way I've Always Heard It Should Be" is a song performed by Carly Simon, and the lead single from her self-titled debut album Carly Simon (1971). Her friend and frequent collaborator Jacob Brackman wrote the lyrics and Simon wrote the music. The song reached peak positions of No. 10 on the Billboard Hot 100 chart and No. 6 on the Billboard Adult Contemporary chart.

Background
It is an art song with a semiclassical melody in the style of Gabriel Fauré, and Elektra staffers were worried the single was too emotionally complex to be released as Simon's first single. With subject matter that includes "the parents' bad marriage; the friends' unhappy lives; the boyfriend's enthusiasm for marriage but controlling nature; the woman's initial resistance and ultimate capitulation."

Simon was quoted as saying, "When I first wrote it I thought it was an unusual thing for people to break up, and now all my friends are divorced."

Recognition
The success of the song propelled Simon into the limelight. Apart from being a Top 10 hit, the song also earned Simon a nomination for Best Female Pop Vocal Performance at the 14th Annual Grammy Awards in 1972, where she also won Best New Artist.

"That's the Way I've Always Heard It Should Be" has been included on several compilations of Simon's work, including The Best of Carly Simon (1975), Clouds in My Coffee (1995), The Very Best of Carly Simon: Nobody Does It Better (1999), Anthology (2002), and Reflections: Carly Simon's Greatest Hits (2004), Carly Simon Collector's Edition (2009), and Songs from the Trees (A Musical Memoir Collection)  (2015).

In July 1971 the single reached number one in Boston (WRKO), Burlington, Vermont (WDOT), New Haven (WNHC) and Rochester, New York (WSAY).

No music video existed for this song, although a filmed performance was produced for an episode of the early 1970s PBS series The Great American Dream Machine.

In addition, Simon's performance of the song in New York City at the 1971 Schaefer Music Festival was filmed for the ABC television special Good Vibrations from Central Park. Simon performed on the 2nd and 3rd of July. ABC broadcast its special on August 19, 1971. In 2009, video of Simon's performance was posted to the official Carly Simon YouTube channel, where, as of 2022, it is still available.

Track listing
7" single
 "That's the Way I've Always Heard It Should Be" – 4:15
 "Alone" – 3:36

Chart performance

Weekly charts

Year-end charts

Awards

References

External links
Carly Simon's Official Website

1971 debut singles
1971 songs
Carly Simon songs
Songs written by Carly Simon
Songs written by Jacob Brackman
Song recordings produced by Eddie Kramer
1970s ballads
Elektra Records singles
Songs with feminist themes
Songs about marriage